The Old Town Bridge is a historic stone arch bridge in Wayland, Massachusetts. It is located just north of Old Sudbury Road, and is sited across what was formerly a channel of the Sudbury River, which now flows just west and north of the bridge. The four-arch bridge was built in 1848 by Josiah Russell on a site where it is supposed that the first bridge in Middlesex County was built in the 1640s. It was for many years on the major east–west route connecting Boston to points west and south. Originally built of dry-laid stone, the bridge was rebuilt with mortar after being damaged by flooding in 1900. The bridge was open to vehicular traffic until 1955.

The bridge was listed on the National Register of Historic Places in 1975.

See also
List of bridges on the National Register of Historic Places in Massachusetts
National Register of Historic Places listings in Middlesex County, Massachusetts

References

Road bridges on the National Register of Historic Places in Massachusetts
Bridges completed in 1848
Bridges in Middlesex County, Massachusetts
National Register of Historic Places in Middlesex County, Massachusetts
Stone arch bridges in the United States
Buildings and structures in Wayland, Massachusetts